This article contains a list of populated places in Kurdistan Region of Iraq. The region has four provinces divided into districts and sub-districts. The populated places include cities, towns and villages.

Dihok Governorate

Akrê District
Akrê District consists of the four sub-districts of Akrê, Dînarte, Bicîl and Girdesîn. Akrê is the capital of the district.

Amêdî District
Amêdî District consists of the six sub-districts of Amêdî, Sersing, Kanî Masî, Dêrelûk and Çemankê and Bamernê. Amêdî is the capital of the district.

Berdereş District
Berdereş District consists of the four sub-districts of Berdereş, Daretû, Ravya and Kelek. Berdereş is the capital of the district.

Dihok District
Dihok District consists of the three sub-districts of Dihok, Mangeş and Zawîte. Dihok is the capital of the district.

Sêmêl District
Sêmêl District consists of the three sub-districts of Sêmêl, Batîl and Fayda. The city of Sêmêl is the capital of the district.

Şêxan District
Şêxan District consists of the three sub-districts of Şêxan, Qesrok, Etrîş and Zîlkan. The city of  Şêxan is the capital of the district.

Zaxo District
Zaxo District consists of the four sub-districts of Zaxo, Rizgarî, Derkar and Batîfa. The city of Zaxo is the capital of the district.

Erbil Governorate

Çoman District
Çoman District consists of the three sub-districts of Çoman, Gelale, Qesrê, Haci Omeran and Simîlan. Çoman is the capital of the district.

Daşti Hewlêr District
Daşti Hewlêr District consists of the three sub-districts of Daretû, Quştepe and Kesnezan. Daretû is the capital of the district.

Hewlêr District
Hewlêr consists of the four sub-districts of Hewlêr, Behirke, Enkawa and Şemamok. Hewlêr is the capital of the district.

Koye District
Koye District consists of the four sub-districts of Koye, Teq Teq, Şoriş, Aşîtî, Sitkan and Segirdkan. Koye is the capital of the district.

Mêrgesor District
Mêrgesor District consists of the six sub-districts of Mêrgesor, Barzan, Pîran, Şêrwan Mezin, Meznê and Goretû. Mêrgesor is the capital of the district.

Mexmur District
Mexmur District consists of the five sub-districts of Mexmûr, Gwêr, Kendênawe, Qerac and Melaqere. Mexmûr is the capital of the district.

Rawandiz District
Rawandiz District consists of the two sub-districts of Rawandiz and Wertê. Rawandiz is the capital of the district.

Şeqlawe District
Şeqlawe District consists of the six sub-districts of Şeqlawe, Selahedîn, Herîr, Hîran, Basirme and Balîsan. Şeqlawe is the capital of the district.

Soran District
Soran District consists of the four sub-districts of Soran, Xelîfan, Diana and Sîdekan. Soran is the capital of the district.

Xebat District
Xebat District consists of the four sub-districts of Xebat, Dare Şekran, Rizgarî and Kewrgosk. Xebat is the capital of the district.

Halabja Governorate
Halabja Governorate consists of the four districts of Biyare, Halabja, Sirwan and Xurmal. Halabja is the capital of the governorate.

Biyare District

Helebce District

Sirwan District

Xurmal District

Sulaymaniyah Governorate

Çemçemal District 
Çemçemal District consists of the seven sub-districts of Çemçemal, Şoris, Sengaw, Tekiye, Axceler, Qadirkerem, and Tekyeyî Cebarî. Çemçemal is the capital of the district.

Derbendîxan District 
Derbendîxan District consists of the two sub-districts of Derbendîxan and Bawexoşên. Derbendîxan is the capital of the district.

Dokan District 
Dokan District consists of the six sub-districts of Dokan, Surdaş, Pîremegrun, Xelekan, Xidran and Bingird. Dokan is the capital of the district.

Kalar District 
Kalar District consists of the four sub-districts of Kalar, Rizgarî, Pêbaz and Şêx Tewîl. Kalar is the capital of the district.

Kifrî District
Kifrî District consists of the five sub-districts of Kifrî, Awespî, Serqella, Newcul and Koks. Kifrî is the capital of the district.

Mawat District 
Mawat District consists of the sub-district of Mawat. Mawat is the capital of the district.

Pşdar District
Pşdar District consists of the six sub-districts of Qelladizê, Hêro, Hellşo, Jarawa, Nawdeşit and Îsêwê. Qelladizê is the capital of the district.

Qeredax District 
Qeredax District consists of the two sub-districts of Qeredax and Sêwsênan. Qeredax is the capital of the district.

Pêncwîn District 
Pêncwîn District consists of the three sub-districts of Pêncwîn, Germik and Nallparêz. Pêncwîn is the capital of the district.

Ranya District
Ranya District consists of the five sub-districts of Ranya, Çiwarqurine, Haciawa, Bêtwate and Serkepan. Ranya is the capital of the district.

Seyid Sadiq District 
Seyid Sadiq District consists of the two sub-districts of Seyid Sadiq and Siruçik. Seyid Sadiq is the capital of the district.

Sulaymaniyah District 
Slêmanî District consists of the four sub-districts of Slêmanî, Bekreco, Bazyan and Tancerio (Erbet). Slêmanî is the capital of the district.

Şarbajêr District 
Şarbajêr District consists of the five sub-districts of Çiwarta, Siyweyl, Sîtek, Zelan and Gapîlon. Şarbajêr is the capital of the district.

Şahrezûr District 
Şahrezûr District consists of the two sub-districts of Şahrezûr and Warmawa. Şahrezûr is the capital of the district.

Xaneqîn District 
Xaneqîn District consists of the three sub-districts of Meydan, Bemo and Qorietû. Meydan is the capital of the district.

Notes

References 

Kurdistan Region (Iraq)